The House of Branicki (plural: Braniccy) was a powerful Polish aristocratic family. The family acquired influence in the Polish–Lithuanian Commonwealth in the 18th century.

History
The Braniccy of Korczak coat of arms most likely originated in Branica in Lublin region. They rose to power and  fortune with Franciszek Ksawery Branicki, Great Crown Hetman and one of the leaders of the Targowica Confederation.

Coat of arms
The Branicki family used the Korczak coat of arms.

Notable members
 Piotr Branicki (died 1762), castelan of Bracław
 Franciszek Ksawery Branicki (c. 1730–1819), Great Hetman of the Crown, member of the Targowica Confederation, first in the family to be owner of land estate in Biała Cerkiew
 Elżbieta Branicka (c. 1734–1800), mother of Kazimierz Nestor Sapieha
 Władysław Grzegorz Branicki (1783–1843), owner of land estate in Biała Cerkiew
 Zofia Branicka (1790–1879), wife of Artur Potocki
 Franciszek Ksawery Branicki (1816–1879), financier and political activist in France (Great Emigration)
  Eliza Krasińska, née Branicka (1820–1876), wife of poet Zygmunt Krasiński
 Aleksander Branicki, owner of land estate in Sucha, collector, traveller, naturalist
 Konstanty Branicki (1824–1884), ornithologist, collector, traveller
 Katarzyna Branicka (1825–1907), wife of Adam Józef Potocki
 Władysław Michał Branicki (1826–1884), owner of land estate in Biała Cerkiew
 Władysław Branicki (1848–1914), owner of land estate in Sucha
 Ksawery Branicki (1864–1926), naturalist, landowner, since 1892 owner of Wilanów
 Adam Branicki (1892–1947), the last male member of the Branicki family of the Korczak Coat of Arms and last owner of Wilanów (before nationalisation)
 Anna Branicka-Wolska (1924), the last living female of the Branicki family of the Korczak Coat of Arms, wife of Tadeusz Wolski
 Beata Maria Branicka (1926–1988), member of the Armia Krajowa, she participated in the Warsaw Uprising of 1944, wife of Leszek Rybiński

Palaces

See also
 Branicki (Gryf) family
 Branicki Residential House

External links
 Zarys kariery Branickich herbu Gryf oraz Branickich herbu Korczak (pl)

References